South Carolina Highway 70 (SC 70) is a  primary state highway in the U.S. state of South Carolina. It connects the cities of Barnwell and Denmark with Orangeburg via U.S. Route 301 (US 301) and US 601.

Route description 
SC 70 is connected together with barnwell, Denmark, Orangeburg and Allen St And Main St is Connected together

History

It was established around 1938 as a new primary routing from SC 64 in Barnwell to SC 6 in Denmark. In 1940, SC 70 was extended in both directions: west in concurrency with SC 64 to the Salkehatchie River, and east on new primary routing to SC 332. In 1941 or 1942, SC 70 was extended southwest on new primary routing to SC 28, then in concurrency with it to Martin, where it went southeast as new routing to SC 631.

In 1948, SC 70 was converted back to its original 1938 routing between Barnwell and Denmark; however a  section also existed between Martin and SC 37. All roads not in concurrency were reverted to secondary status.

Around 1952, the Martin to SC 37 piece of SC 70 was downgraded to secondary status, becoming Revolutionary Trail (S-3-47).  Around 1958, SC 70 was re-extended east of Denmark to its current eastern terminus with US 301/US 601.

Major intersections

Barnwell alternate route

South Carolina Highway 70 Alternate (SC 70 Alt.) was an alternate route that existed in the southeastern part of Barnwell. It was established by 1940 on a backwards L-shaped path from SC 3 east-northeast on Hagood Avenue, then north-northwest on Carolina Avenue, to end at SC 70. In 1947, it was decommissioned.

See also

References

External links

 
 Mapmikey's South Carolina Highways Page: SC 70
 Mapmikey's South Carolina Highways Page: Former SC 70 Alt.

070
Transportation in Barnwell County, South Carolina
Transportation in Bamberg County, South Carolina
Transportation in Orangeburg County, South Carolina